The 1921–22 Bradford City A.F.C. season was the 15th in the club's history.

The club finished 21st in Division One, and reached the 2nd round of the FA Cup. The club were related to Division Two after spending 10 seasons in Division One.

Sources

References

Bradford City A.F.C. seasons
Bradford City